Michael Hissmann (1752, Hermannstadt – 1784, Göttingen) was a German philosopher, a radical materialist who translated Condillac and Joseph Priestley into German.

Hissmann studied philosophy at Erlangen and Göttingen. From 1778 to 1783 he edited the Magazin für die Philosophie und ihre Geschichte. He became an extraordinary professor at Göttingen in 1782, and a full professor in 1784.

Works
Psychologische Versuche, ein Beytrag sur esoterischen Logik, 1777
Anleitung zur Kenntniß der ausserlesenen Literatur in allen Theilen der Philosophie, 1778
Briefe über Gegenstände der Philosophie, 1778

References

1752 births
1784 deaths
German philosophers
Materialists
University of Erlangen-Nuremberg alumni
University of Göttingen alumni
German male writers